The Rhenish Missionary Society (Rhenish  of the river Rhine) was one of the largest Protestant missionary societies in Germany.  Formed from smaller missions founded as far back as 1799, the Society was amalgamated on 23 September 1828, and its first missionaries were ordained and sent off to South Africa by the end of the year.

The London Missionary Society was already active in the area, and a closer working relationship was formed with them.  The Society established its first mission station in the Cederberg in 1829, named Wupperthal, and predated the naming of the German city by 100 years.

Very soon, the missionaries started migrating north through the barren and inhospitable south-western Africa.  Here they encountered various local tribes such as the Herero, Nama and Damara, and were frequently in the middle of wars between them.  The missionaries tried to broker peace deals between the tribes, and for this reason were later seen as political assets by the tribes.

Around the same time, debate started in Germany regarding its colonial empire, with the activities of the RMS in distant Africa fanning imaginations.  The unclaimed area to the north of the Cape Colony was proclaimed German South West Africa in 1880, but they quickly ran into numerous problems, since Germany was inexperienced at colonization. The Herero and Namaqua Genocide during 1904–1907 proved to be the nadir of their rule, and combined with the effects of World War I, Germany was unable to maintain a foothold so far from home. South Africa annexed the area in 1915, renaming it South West Africa.  During this time, missionaries' reactions ranged from compassion and help for the local tribes, to patriotism and support of colonial interests.

In 1861, a station in North Sumatra, Indonesia, was launched and it lasted until 1940. A book concerning the missionary work there was written by the first evangelist woman who joined the Society, Hester Needham.

RMS was also active in South China, where they constructed a Hospital in Tungkun, the area is now called Dongguan, Guangdong Province, China. The hospital was supported by several notable medical missionaries, including Dr. Johannes E. Kühne, Dr. Gottlieb Olpp, Dr. Eich, Dr. Zeiß.

During the 20th century, the Society focused on its work in southern Africa.  The Society ultimately amalgamated all of its mission stations in South Africa into the Dutch Reformed Church, except for Wupperthal which chose to join the Moravian Church. The mission stations in Namibia became part of the Evangelical Lutheran Church there.

In 1971, the Rhenish Mission and the Bethel Mission were combined into the Vereinte Evangelische Mission.

Literature
 N. Needham: God First or Hester Needham’s work in Sumatra, Horace Hart Printer to the University, Oxford 1899.
G. Kunze: Im Dienste des Kreuzes auf ungebahnten Pfaden, Barmen 1897, 3rd edition 1925.
 Eduard Kriele: Das Kreuz unter den Palmen. Die Rheinische Mission in Neu-Guinea, Barmen 1927.
 W. Berner: Rheinische Missionsgesellschaft (RMG), in Religion in Geschichte und Gegenwart (RGG), 5. vol., Tübingen 1961, p. 1083.
 Bade, K.J., Colonial Missions and Imperialism: the background to the fiasco of the Rhenish Mission in New Guinea, Australian Journal of Politics & History, 21:2 (1975), pp. 73–94. 
 K.-J. Bade: Colonial Missions and Imperialism: The Background to the Fiasco of the Rhenish Mission in New Guinea, in: John A. Moses - Paul M. Kennedy (eds.): Germany in the Pacific and Far East, 1870-1914, Brisbane 1977.
 Hermann Reiner: Beginnings at Madang - The Rhenish Mission, in: Herwig Wagner/Hermann Reiner (eds.): The Lutheran Church in Papua New Guinea. The first Hundred Years 1886-1986, Lutheran Publishing House: Adelaide 1986, Second revised ed. 1987, pp. 99–139.
 Paul Steffen: Missionsbeginn in Neuguinea. Die Anfänge der Rheinischen, Neuendettelsauer und Steyler Missionsarbeit in Neuguinea. (Studia Instituti Missiologici S.V.D. - 61) Steyler Verlag, Nettetal 1995, .

References

 

 
1828 establishments in Prussia